Vito Dell'Aquila (born November 3, 2000) is an Italian taekwondo athlete. He won a  gold medal at the 2020 Summer Olympics. He also won the gold medal in the men's flyweight event at the 2022 World Taekwondo Championships held in Guadalajara, Mexico.

Career 
On 25 June 2017 he won a bronze medal at the 2017 World Taekwondo Championships in Muju losing in the semifinals to the eventual world champion Kim Tae-hun in the Men's finweight (54 kg) competition.

On 24 July 2021, being ranked number 2 in the Men's 58 kg olympic ranking, he won the gold medal at the 2020 Summer Olympics beating the 2021 African champion, Mohamed Khalil Jendoubi, in the final of the Men's 58 kg.

See also
 Italy at the 2020 Summer Olympics

References

External links
 

Living people
2000 births
Italian male taekwondo practitioners
Taekwondo practitioners at the 2020 Summer Olympics
Olympic taekwondo practitioners of Italy
Medalists at the 2020 Summer Olympics
Olympic gold medalists for Italy
Olympic medalists in taekwondo
European Taekwondo Championships medalists
World Taekwondo Championships medalists
21st-century Italian people